Nikolay Karpenko (born 1981) is a Kazakhstani ski jumper

Nikolay Karpenko may also refer to:

 Nikolai Karpenko (footballer) (born 1977), Russian football player